Forsebia is a genus of moths in the family Erebidae. The genus was described by Richards in 1936.

Species
 Forsebia cinis (Guenée, 1852) (syn: Forsebia perlaeta H. Edwards, 1882)
 Forsebia mendozina (Hampson, 1926)

References

Melipotini
Moth genera